Nava Raj Subedi (born 1939 in Ramechhap District, Nepal) is a Nepali politician and former Chairperson (Speaker) of Rastriya Panchayat (Parliament) of Nepal.

Political career
He started active political life by being elected the first President of “Tribhuvan University Students Union” in 1960. He joined the party less Panchayat system since its inception, and elected continuously (from 1962-1990) as member of the parliament (Rastriya Panchayat) from Ramechhap district. He served the country for more than 30 years as:
1962 district president of ramechhap
1967 Assistant Minister Ministry of Finance
1968 State Minister Ministry of Home and Panchayat
1968 Minister Ministry of Industry of commerce
1969 Minister Ministry of Industry, Commerce, Works, Communication, Transport, Forest and Water Power.
1978 Chairman Parliament (Rastriya Panchayat) finance committee 
1979 Minister Ministry of Home and Panchayat
1980 chairman of public finance committee of parliament
1981 Minister Ministry of Home and Panchayat

Awards
1. Suvarajyavisएक Padak 1979
2. Gauravmaya Suvkyat Trishakti Patta (First Class) 1986
3. Legion D’honour (France) 1989 
4. Daibi Prakop Uddhar Padak 1989
5. SAARC Padak 1988
6. Suprassidha Prabal Gorkha Dakshin Bahu (First class) 1990
7. Birendra Aishworya Sewa Padak 2002

Books written 
1.इतिहासको एक कालखण्ड (Itihasko ek kaalkhanda)

References 

1939 births
People from Ramechhap District
Living people
Members of the Rastriya Panchayat
Khas people